I Don't may refer to:

 "I Don't" (Mariah Carey song)
 "I Don't" (Danielle Peck song)

See also 
 Don't (disambiguation)